Gustavo Manzur (born 9 December 1959) is a Salvadoran former wrestler who competed in the 1984 Summer Olympics and in the 1988 Summer Olympics. At the 1987 Pan American Games 68.0 kg. Greco-Roman category he finished sixth and at the 1987 Pan American Games 68.0 kg. freestyle category he finished eighth. At the 1995 Pan American Games 82.0 kg. Greco-Roman category he finished eighth.

References

External links
 

1959 births
Living people
Salvadoran male sport wrestlers
Olympic wrestlers of El Salvador
Wrestlers at the 1984 Summer Olympics
Wrestlers at the 1988 Summer Olympics
Pan American Games competitors for El Salvador
Wrestlers at the 1987 Pan American Games
Wrestlers at the 1995 Pan American Games